Palm Springs International Film Festival (sometimes stylized shortly as PSIFF) is a film festival held in Palm Springs, California. Originally promoted by Mayor Sonny Bono and then sponsored by Nortel, it started in 1989 and is held annually in January. It is run by the Palm Springs International Film Society, which also runs the Palm Springs International Festival of Short Films (ShortFest), a festival of short films and film market in June.

Though the festival does feature American independent films, the focus from its inception was to shine a spotlight on international cinema.

The festival was cancelled in both 2021 and 2022 due to the COVID-19 pandemic in California. It will be held from January 6 to January 16 in 2023. The 34th edition will screen 134 films from 64 countries including 27 premieres. Film Awards ceremony on January 5 at the Palm Springs Convention Center, will start the celebrations.

Details
Michael Barker, co-president of Sony Pictures Classics, described the festival as a good place to show foreign-language movies and heralded this festival's ability to spread good word-of-mouth for movies. The event is noted for screening most foreign Oscar nominees. In 2013, the festival screened 42 of the 71 movies that were submitted by countries around the world to the Oscars for that year's foreign language film prize.

In the days before the festival's opening, several of the foreign filmmakers convene at Sunnylands, the Annenberg estate in Rancho Mirage, to trade strategies on funding, producing and promoting their movies.

The festival regularly attracts around 135,000 people, with some 70% coming from outside of the Coachella Valley, including Canada and Europe. It is noted for its Award Ceremonies where such actors as Christian Bale, Brad Pitt, Clint Eastwood, Sean Penn, Dustin Hoffman, Anne Hathaway, Allison Janney, Brie Larson and Leonardo DiCaprio have appeared. In January 2011, the festival's honorees included Ben Affleck and Danny Boyle.  The current Artistic Director of the festival is Liliana Rodriguez.

In 2021 the main festival was not held, but the Palm Springs International Festival of Short Films on June 22-28 did go ahead. As of April 8, 2021, the next  PSIFF was scheduled for January 6−17, 2022. However, due to rising cases of COVID-19, the 2022 festival was canceled.

Awards

Film Gala Awards
The Gala awards are Sonny Bono Visionary Award, Career Achievement Award, Desert Palm Achievement Award, Director of the Year Award, Frederick Loewe Award for Film Composing, Icon Award, Chairman's Award, Ensemble Performance Award and Spotlight Award.

In 2014 the Desert Palm Achievement Award  was given to Matthew McConaughey for his role in Dallas Buyers Club and Sandra Bullock for her role in Gravity, while Johnny Depp and Cate Blanchett received the Desert Palm Achievement Award in 2016 for Black Mass and Carol, respectively. Casey Affleck received the Desert Palm Achievement Award in 2017 for Manchester by the Sea. Gary Oldman and Saoirse Ronan received the Desert Palm Achievement Award in 2018 for their films Darkest Hour and Lady Bird.

Festival awards
The following awards were presented at the 2019 Palm Springs International Film Festival:

 FIPRESCI Prize for Best Foreign Language Film
 FIPRESCI Prize for Best Actor in a Foreign Language Film
 FIPRESCI Prize for Best Actress in a Foreign Language Film
 New Voices New Visions Award
 John Schlesinger Award
 CV Cine Award
 Ricky Jay Magic of Cinema Award
 GoE Bridging the Borders Award
 Audience Award for Best Narrative Feature
 Audience Award for Best Documentary Feature

References

External links 

Palm Springs, California
Film festivals in California
Cinema of Southern California
Annual events in Riverside County, California
January events